The Illinois Department of Natural Resources (IDNR) is the code department of the Illinois state government that operates the state parks and state recreation areas, enforces the fishing and game laws of Illinois, regulates Illinois coal mines, operates the Illinois State Museum system, and oversees scientific research into the soil, water, and mineral resources of the state. In 2017, the Illinois Historic Preservation Division was added to its portfolio. It is headquartered in the state capital of Springfield.

History
The former Illinois Department of Conservation was reorganized into the Illinois Department of Natural Resources by executive order in 1995.  The reorganization, codified into state law by Public Act 89-50, also added functions of the former Illinois Department of Energy and Natural Resources and the Illinois Department of Mines and Minerals to the agglomerated agency

Organization
As of 2009, the Illinois Department of Natural Resources was divided up into 16 offices and bureaus 

 Administration
 Architecture, Engineering and Grants
 Compliance, Equal Employment Opportunity and Ethics
 Director
 Law Enforcement
 Land Management
 Legal Counsel
 Legislation
 Mines & Minerals
 Public Events, Programs & Promotions
 Public Services and Education
 Realty & Environmental Planning
 Resource Conservation
 State Museums
 Water Resources
 State Surveys

In 2017, parts of the Illinois Historic Preservation Agency, were folded in the IDNR and became the Illinois Historic Preservation Division.

Today
As of fiscal year 2006, the Illinois Department of Natural Resources had a budget of $187.1 million   Its headquarters is located at 1 Natural Resources Way, Springfield, Illinois 62702, adjacent to the Illinois State Fairgrounds

See also
List of law enforcement agencies in Illinois
List of State Fish and Wildlife Management Agencies in the U.S.
Illinois State Parks

Notes

External links
 Illinois Department of Natural Resources

Natural Resources
State wildlife and natural resource agencies of the United States
Natural resources agencies in the United States
State law enforcement agencies of Illinois
State environmental protection agencies of the United States